Nonsuch station is a flag stop station in Nonsuch, Manitoba, Canada.  The stop is served by Via Rail's Winnipeg – Churchill train. The station has the same name as the Nonsuch, the ship that set sail for Hudson Bay in 1668 and helped establish early fur trade in the region.

Footnotes

External links 
Via Rail Station Information

Via Rail stations in Manitoba